Cleberson Souza Santos (born 10 February 1978 in Salvador, Bahia), known as just Cleberson, is a Brazilian footballer who plays as a defender.

Biography
He started his club football career in Brazil with São Paulo before moving to Dutch giants PSV Eindhoven.

He returned to Brazil in 2002 with Botafogo  and then moved to Saudi Arabia to play for Al-Wahda (Saudi Arabia) until 25 January 2005, he returned to Brazil for Clube do Remo. In July 2005, he left for Cabofriense, signed a one-year deal.

He signed for New Zealand team Wellington Phoenix FC in the A-League on 30 July 2007 but was released from his contract in November 2007.

Cleberson was caught up in a scandal after kissing a referee in a match.

Cleberson was appointed Head Coach of Redlands United Football Club on 18 September 2018

References

External links
 Brazilian FA Database
 Released from Phoenix

1978 births
Botafogo de Futebol e Regatas players
Brazilian footballers
Association football central defenders
Living people
Sportspeople from Bahia
PSV Eindhoven players
Wellington Phoenix FC players
A-League Men players